Kia Gahan (also Romanized as Kīā Gahān; also known as Kīā Kahān) is a village in Moridan Rural District, Kumeleh District, Langarud County, Gilan Province, Iran. At the 2006 census, its population was 822, in 216 families.

References 

Populated places in Langarud County